Marlborough College Malaysia (MCM) is a co-educational British international school in Malaysia for boarding and day pupils. The school is the sister school of Marlborough College in Wiltshire, UK. The college comprises a Pre-Preparatory School for children aged 3 to 8 years; a Preparatory School for boarding and day pupils aged between 8 and 12 years; and a Senior School for boarding and day pupils aged between 13 and 18 years. The current enrollment is approximately 750 pupils, representing 40 nationalities, and the staff-to-pupil ratio at the College is 1:6. The majority of the teaching body have teaching experience either in Marlborough College UK or other British independent schools.

History
Marlborough College Malaysia opened on 27 August 2012. The school was built on the former Honan palm plantation as part of the Iskandar Development project in Johor on the southern tip of peninsula Malaysia. The opening of the College was described as a catalytic project complementing the EduCity development and wider regeneration of the Iskandar region of Johor. Marlborough College Malaysia was officially opened by HRH Raja Zarith Sofiah Binti Almarhum Sultan Idris Shah, consort to the Sultan of Johor, on 24 February 2013. The founding Master of the College was Mr Robert Pick, former Second Master of Marlborough College in the UK. Following Mr Pick's retirement, Mr Alan Stevens took over as Master on 1 August 2017.

Notable Events

Houses

There are four Senior Boarding Houses, catering for pupils from Years 9 to 13 (13 to 18 years) and two Junior Boarding Houses, for Years 5 to 8 (9 to 13 years), each with a Housemaster or Housemistress, Resident House Tutor, Dame and team of visiting tutors providing the children with on-going support and monitoring. A programme of structured, recreational and social activities is planned throughout the week, with a variety of clubs on offer which include: sports, drama, art, music and languages. Weekly boarding is available in the Houses. Day and Prep school pupils are assigned a House on enrolling at the college. The Houses have been given names either commemorating a figure from Marlborough's past or reflecting the location of the College in Johor, Malaysia.

Names of the Houses

Masters (headmasters) of Marlborough College Malaysia
 2012–2017 Robert Pick
 2017– Alan Stevens

Governance
Marlborough College Malaysia is an offshoot of Marlborough College in Wiltshire, England rather than a franchise of the school. It is operated by M East Sdn Bhd, and its directors are mostly old pupils of Marlborough College. The directors as of 2017 are:  Tunku Ali Redhauddin Tuanku Muhriz (Chairman), Dr C J Lim, Wan Adlan Wan Abdul Rahman, HY Lau, Jessie Soon, Guan Hock Chua, Richard Fleck, Thye Seng Chan, Dato’ Ka Wei Siew, Shahryn Azmi, Thomas Kirkwood, Nick Sampson and John Baker.

Facilities
Outdoor facilities in the 90 acre campus include nine grass pitches, 50m swimming pool, junior swimming pool, cricket ground, athletics track, five tennis courts, netball courts, rugby and football pitches and an all-weather pitch for hockey and games.
The Sports complex includes a fully equipped fitness suite, indoor netball, basketball, volleyball and badminton courts. Adjoining the Sports Hall are four squash courts and an indoor climbing centre. There is also Barton Farm, where pupils have the opportunity to plant and grow food which is then used by catering to feed the College. Recently, the Lake has been developed to allow for recreational activities such as Kayaking and 'catch and release' Fishing.

Other facilities at the College include; two Drama Halls, a Theatre, three Dining Halls, Science Laboratories, Design Technology Centre, Art Studios, Music Rooms, Learning Resource Centre, University Guidance Centre and Medical Centre with 24-hour cover.

Curriculum
The academic curriculum is similar to that at MCM's sister school in the UK. However the College offers IGCSE options centred on a core curriculum of English Language, English Literature, Mathematics and the three Sciences, and with four more subjects (chosen from the list below.)

IGCSE
All pupils follow the core curriculum: English Language, English Literature, Mathematics and the three Sciences. Four more subjects may be chosen from the lists below (within various option groups):

In 2021, 64% of grades awarded were at A* and A, with 40% at A*

IB Diploma
In the Sixth Form, pupils study the International Baccalaureate (IB) Program IB Diploma Programme results in 2020 and 2021 averaged at 35 points, with a 100% pass rate. With many of the pupils going on to study at Internationally renowned Universities. compared to the world average of 33 points

Pupils must study three subjects at Higher Level (HL) and three at Standard Level (SL). One subject must be chosen from each of the Groups 1 to 5, plus an extra choice from Groups 2, 3, 4 or 6.

School terms
There are three academic terms in the year:
The Michaelmas Term, from early September to mid December 
The Lent Term, from mid January to late March;
The Summer Term, from late April to late June or early July.

References

External links

 

Buildings and structures in Iskandar Puteri
International schools in Malaysia
International Baccalaureate schools in Malaysia
Universities and colleges in Johor